"The King of the Foxes" is a short story by Arthur Conan Doyle, first published in the United Kingdom in July 1898 in The Windsor Magazine, and in the United States in August 1898 in Ainslee's Magazine.  While it is not a Sherlock Holmes story, it is recognized by scholars as a forebear of The Hound of the Baskervilles, both for its gothic themes in general and its treatment of a supernaturally terrifying animal in particular.

Background 
Arthur Conan Doyle was, for a time, an enthusiastic fox-hunter. He developed an interest in the activity in the late 1890s, perhaps due to a friendship that began developing at about the same time with Jean Leckie, who enjoyed fox-hunting (and who would later marry Conan Doyle). Conan Doyle came to greatly enjoy riding to the hounds, and later recalled the experience fondly. His diary (now in the collection of the British Library), includes an entry recording January 13–16, 1898 as the dates on which he wrote "The King of the Foxes".

Synopsis 
The story is told by an unnamed narrator who is themself recalling a story told by another person—a Master of foxhounds—about a hunting adventure that was so strange and frightening that it scared an alcoholic young hunter into sobriety.

Related works 
Conan Doyle's interest in fox-hunting manifested itself in numerous poems, short stories, and other writings spanning most of his writing life. Indeed, his last writing on the subject came from beyond the grave, in an essay about war published posthumously on July 27, 1930.

Print editions 
"The King of the Foxes", in The Windsor Magazine (July 1898).
"The King of the Foxes", in Ainslee's Magazine (August 1898).
"The King of the Foxes", in The Green Flag and Other Stories of War and Sport (Smith, Elder & Co., 1900).
"The King of the Foxes", in Tales of the Ring and Camp (John Murray, 1922).
Anastasia Klimchynskaya, The King of the Foxes: Transcription and Annotation, in Regulation and Imagination: Legal and Literary Perspectives on Fox-hunting (edited by Ross E. Davies) (Green Bag Press 2021).

References

External links 

 

Short stories by Arthur Conan Doyle
1898 short stories
Works originally published in Ainslee's Magazine